Vahdat International Cup was an international football tournament hosted by Iran that was played at Tehran in February 1982. This tournament's participants were teams from Iran and friend countries such as Algeria, Syria and Libya. Eight teams from four countries (Iran, Syria, Algeria, and Libya) participated, with Iran having five teams and the other three nations having one each. The Iranian teams and the Syria Army XI belonged to AFC, with Algeria Army XI and Libya Army XI belonging to CAF. The games were all played at one venue, the Shahid Shiroudi Stadium, with a capacity of 30,000 at the time.

Participants
Eight teams participated in this tournament:

Venue

Results
Known results are as follows:

Group stage

Group 1

Group 2

Semi finals

Third-place match
There was no third place match, however Malavan earned third rank among all participants.

Final

Squads

Persepolis
Persepolis squad was short of several national team and national army team players such as Mohammad Mayeli Kohan, Nasser Mohammadkhani, Abbas Kargar, Ebrahim Kian Tahmasebi, Behrouz Soltani, Mohammad Panjali and Gholamreza Fathabadi.
Several players from youth team took part in this tournament.

Head coach:   Ali Parvin

Esteghlal

Malavan

Iran U23

Iran Army XI

Syria Army XI

Algeria Army XI

Libya Army XI

References

1982
1981–82 in Iranian football
1981–82 in Algerian football
1981–82 in Libyan football
1982 in Asian football